"Mamacita" is a song by British rapper Tinie Tempah. It was released on 8 July 2016, as the third single from his third studio album, Youth (2017). The song, produced by Bless Beats, features vocals from Nigerian singer Wizkid.

Music video
The song's music video premiered on 4 July 2016, via Tempah's official YouTube channel. It was directed by Craig Moore and was filmed in Dominican Republic.

Charts

Certifications

References

External links

2016 singles
2016 songs
Tinie Tempah songs
Wizkid songs
Parlophone singles
Songs written by Tinie Tempah
Songs written by Jin Jin (musician)
Songs written by Wizkid